Bassetlaw by-election may refer to:

 1890 Bassetlaw by-election
 1968 Bassetlaw by-election

Disambiguation pages